Eileen Myers is an American television writer and producer, who has worked on shows Big Love, Dark Blue and Hung.

Career 
Myers began her television career on Big Love and remained a writer and producer on the series until its fourth season in 2010. She also contributed scripts for the Jerry Bruckheimer series Dark Blue and is currently serving as a writer and supervising producer on the HBO comedy-drama series Hung.

Television episodes by Myers

Big Love 
 Roberta's Funeral (1.6)
 Where There's a Will (1.11) (story)
 Vision Thing (2.05)
 Take Me As I Am (2.11)
 Oh, Pioneers (2.12)
 Prom Queen (3.03)
 Outer Darkness (3.09)
 End of Days (4.09)

Dark Blue 
 K-Town (1.04)
 Betsy (1.09) (with Matt McGuinness)

Hung 
A Man, a Plan or Thank You, Jimmy Carter (2.05)
Third Base or The Rash (2.08) (with Julia Brownell)

References

External links 

American television writers
American television producers
American women television producers
Living people
American women television writers
Place of birth missing (living people)
Year of birth missing (living people)
21st-century American women